Jeffrey Rosen may refer to:

 Jeffrey Rosen (legal academic) (born 1964), U.S. academic and commentator on legal affairs
 Jeffrey Rosen (businessman), American billionaire businessman
 Jeffrey A. Rosen (born 1958), U.S. lawyer who served as Deputy Attorney General, acting Attorney General, and Deputy Secretary of Transportation
 Jeffrey F. Rosen, Santa Clara County District Attorney in the 2015 criminal case People v. Turner